Joseph Tiophil Panga (born 26 June 1995) is a Tanzanian long-distance runner.

In 2019, he competed in the senior men's race at the 2019 IAAF World Cross Country Championships held in Aarhus, Denmark. He finished in 32nd place.

References

External links 
 

Living people
1995 births
Place of birth missing (living people)
Tanzanian male long-distance runners
Tanzanian male cross country runners
Athletes (track and field) at the 2022 Commonwealth Games
Commonwealth Games competitors for Tanzania
20th-century Tanzanian people
21st-century Tanzanian people